Suman Shringi is a former mayor of Kota city in Rajasthan. She is a member of national executive of Bharatiya Janata Party. She unsuccessfully contested election to Rajasthan Legislative Assembly from Kota in 2008.

References

People from Kota, Rajasthan
Rajasthan municipal councillors
Mayors of places in Rajasthan
Bharatiya Janata Party politicians from Rajasthan
Living people
Women mayors of places in Rajasthan
21st-century Indian women politicians
21st-century Indian politicians
Year of birth missing (living people)